is one of the eight wards of the city of Hiroshima, located in the south of former .

After being merged with Hiroshima in 1973, this ward was named Asaminami-ku. The largest station of Astramline, a new traffic system, is in Asaminami-ku. This system brought population inflow.

As of January 1, 2018, the ward has an estimated population of 245,475, with 101,941 households and a density of 2094 persons per km². The total area is 117.24 km².

Transportation

JR-Kabe line

Astram line

Expressway
San'yō Expressway

Hiroshima Expressway (West Nippon Expressway Company)

Hiroshima Expressway

Industry 
Hiroshima Mitsubishi Heavy Industries in Gion closed its doors in 2003.

Education 
Hiroshima City University
Hiroshima University of Economics
Hiroshima Shudo University
Yasuda Women's University

Agriculture
Former , now a part of the ward, has been a major production area for  since Meiji era. Hiroshimana is a variety of Chinese cabbage and is the main material used for making Hiroshimanazuke (literally "pickled Hiroshimana").

Landslide

In August 2014 many people died in a landslide after very heavy rain.

Footnotes

References 

Wards of Hiroshima